Tobias Ng (born 8 October 1985) is a Canadian badminton player. Born and raised in Vancouver, British Columbia, Ng's father is from Hong Kong and his mother from Macau. He started playing badminton at the Kensington Community Centre, when he was about six years old. He competed at the 2012 Summer Olympics in the mixed doubles event with partner Grace Gao. His younger brother, Derrick Ng, is also an elite level player. Since 2020, Toby coaches advanced to professional level athletes at the Bellevue Badminton Club.

Achievements

Pan American Games 
Mixed doubles

Pan Am Championships 
Men's doubles

Mixed doubles

BWF Grand Prix 
The BWF Grand Prix has two levels: Grand Prix and Grand Prix Gold. It is a series of badminton tournaments, sanctioned by Badminton World Federation (BWF) since 2007.

Men's doubles

Mixed doubles

  BWF Grand Prix Gold tournament
  BWF Grand Prix tournament

BWF International Challenge/Series 
Men's doubles

Mixed doubles

  BWF International Challenge tournament
  BWF International Series tournament

References

External links 
 
 
 
 
 
 
 
 Toby Ng at the Toronto 2015 Pan American Games
 

1985 births
Living people
Sportspeople from Vancouver
Canadian sportspeople of Chinese descent
Canadian male badminton players
Badminton players at the 2012 Summer Olympics
Olympic badminton players of Canada
Badminton players at the 2010 Commonwealth Games
Badminton players at the 2014 Commonwealth Games
Badminton players at the 2011 Pan American Games
Badminton players at the 2015 Pan American Games
Commonwealth Games competitors for Canada
Pan American Games gold medalists for Canada
Pan American Games silver medalists for Canada
Pan American Games medalists in badminton
Medalists at the 2011 Pan American Games
Medalists at the 2015 Pan American Games